The 2010–11 Azadegan League was the 20th season of the Azadegan League and tenth as the second highest division since its establishment in 1991. The season featured 19 teams from the 2009–10 Azadegan League, three new teams relegated from the 2009–10 Persian Gulf Cup: Moghavemat Shiraz, Aboumoslem and Esteghlal Ahvaz and four new teams promoted from the 2009–10 2nd Division: Sepidrood as champions, Naft Masjed Soleyman, Shahrdari Yasouj and Foolad Yazd. Foolad Natanz replaced Sepahan Novin, Machine Sazi replaced Petroshimi Tabriz and Sanat Sari replaced Mehrkam Pars. Shensa Arak changed their name into Hamyari Arak. The league started on 23 September 2010 and ended on 9 May 2011. Damash won the Azadegan League title for the first time in their history. Damash, Mes Sarcheshmeh and Moghavemat Shiraz promoted to the Persian Gulf Cup.

Events

Start of season
 The league was to feature three teams relegated from Persian Gulf Cup in 2009–10; Esteghlal Ahvaz, F.C. Aboomoslem, and Moghavemat Sepasi.
 The League also featured four teams promoted from  The 2nd division: Sepidrood Rasht, Naft Masjed Soleyman, Foolad Yazd, and Shahrdari Yasuj.
 Mehrkam Pars, (formerly of Tehran) was bought by the city of Sari in the province of  Mazandaran. The new team will be known as Sanat Sari F.C.
 Machine Sazi ended its 2009–10 Iran Football's 2nd Division campaign in 4th place (Group A) and could not promote to the Azadegan League. But They bought Petrochimi licence. So They will play in the Azadegan League 2010–11.
 Shensa Arak was replaced by Hamyari Arak.
 Sepahan Novin was replaced by Foolad Natanz.

Teams

Group A

Group B

Managerial changes

Standings

Group A

Group B

Results table

Group A

Group B

Play Off
First leg to be played 18 May 2011; return leg to be played 24 May 2011

First leg

Return leg

Final 

1 Scheduled between Mes Sarcheshmeh and Damash, however, Mes Sarcheshmeh did not show up, Damash awarded championship.

Player statistics

Top scorers, Group A

Top scorers, Group B

Attendances

Average home attendances

Highest attendances

Notes:Updated to games played on 9 May 2011. Source: iplstats.com

See also
 2010–11 Persian Gulf Cup
 2010–11 Iran Football's 2nd Division
 2010–11 Iran Football's 3rd Division
 2010–11 Hazfi Cup
 Iranian Super Cup
 2010–11 Iranian Futsal Super League

References

External links
 هفته اول لیگ آزادگان 
 هفته دوم لیگ آزادگان 

Azadegan League seasons
Iran
2010–11 in Iranian football leagues